Kandathum Kettathum (English: What was seen and heard) is a 1988 Indian Malayalam-language film, directed by Balachandra Menon. The film stars Thilakan, Balachandra Menon, Usha and Baiju in the lead roles. The film, made at a production cost of  lakh.

Plot
Krishnankutty (Balachandra Menon), an educated young man, launches a studio but is betrayed by his partner Sadhanandhan (Mala Aravindan) and struggles to make ends meet. Out of desperation, he decides to end his financial woes with a drastic step.

Cast
 
 Balachandra Menon as Krishnankutty P. K.
 Thilakan as Owner of Minnal Vaarika
 Usha as Muthulekshmi 
 Baiju as Ganeshan 
 Adoor Pankajam 
 Alummoodan as R. Kesava Pillai, Krishnankutty's father
 K. P. A. C. Sunny as Circle Inspector of Police 
Chandraji
 Jagadish as Varghese
 Kochaniyan
 Kollam Thulasi as Security guard Narayanan 
 Mala Aravindan as Flash Studio owner Sadanandan 
 Meena as building rental Mrs. Padmanabhan 
 Kanakalatha as Krishnankutty's sister
 P. C. Soman
 Poojappura Radhakrishnan
 Rudraprathap

References

External links
  
 

1988 films
1980s Malayalam-language films
Films directed by Balachandra Menon